3 Colors Infinity is the only full-length studio album of Japanese pop/rock band Kids Alive. The album was released on January 23, 2002 and contains all of their previous singles.

Track listing

References

2002 albums
Avex Group albums